The Volvo 900 Series is a range of executive cars produced by the Swedish manufacturer Volvo Cars from 1990 to 1998. The 900 Series was introduced in 1990 to replace the 700 Series from which it derived. Prior to the end of its production, the 960 was renamed as the Volvo S90 (saloon) and Volvo V90 (estate), and the 940 was renamed 940 Classic, becoming the last rear-wheel-drive cars from Volvo.

Visible differences between the 700 and the 900 Series included redesigned rear styling of the saloon models (late 700 estates and early 900 estates are visually identical). The 960 was introduced in 1991 along with a new family of modular engines, and then was substantially revised for the 1995 model year, improving the handling. The range was augmented by the new Volvo 850 in 1991. The last of the 900s was sold in 1998. Some 900 Series were built as chassis for ambulances and hearses after the main production run had been completed.


Volvo 940

The Volvo 940 is among the last in the long-running line of large rear-wheel drive cars from Volvo.

Introduced in September 1990, the 940 was essentially a cosmetic reskin of the 740 aside from the completely redesigned rear from the C pillar back on the sedan. All drivetrains, and most options available in the 940 had been available in the 740, with the exception of the 780 Coupé. The 940 was more closely related to the 740 than the 760, sharing the same dashboard, drivetrain choices, and sheet metal from the A-pillar forward. In contrast, the 960 was an evolution of the 760. The 760 / 960 front sheet metal, independent rear suspension, dashboard, and other interior features were all exclusive to the two upscale models. The 940 estate, introduced in May 1991, was almost identical to its 740 estate predecessor.

The engines options were carried over from the 740, with 8-valve 2-litre (B200) and 2.3-litre (B230) four cylinder gasoline engines, either naturally aspirated or turbocharged, as well as the familiar 2.4-litre Volkswagen six-cylinder diesel and turbodiesels being fitted. There were also 16-valve versions of the gasoline engines fitted on some 1991 and 1992 models (B204, B234, naturally aspirated). In 1994, gasoline engine range was limited to 2.3 engines, but the 2.0 turbocharged remained available in some markets with tight tax limits, such as Italy, Belgium, and Portugal. The  turbocharged 2.0 was first presented in February 1991, originally intended for Italy and other such markets it was later also installed in the British market 940 SE. The most commonly found engines on 940s were the naturally aspirated B230FB/131PS (all markets but US), B230FD/115PS (mainly for the US market), the turbocharged B230FK/135PS, B230FT/165PS, B200FT/155PS (for some markets) and the D24TIC/122PS diesel engine.

Engines were fitted with either a 5-speed (M47) or 4-speed+overdrive (M46) manual gearbox or an automatic transmission, either Aisin-Warner AW70/71/72 (3-speed+overdrive) or ZF 4HP22 (4-speed) for some B230FB (or E) and diesel engines. In 1995, the manual gearbox was replaced with a full 5-speed (M90), and the ZF was abandoned for gasoline engines and fitted only on diesels.

The SE emblem denoted very different trim and engine levels in different countries. In Sweden, the 940 SE was an ordinary non-turbo 940 with some optional extras as standard, most notably painted mirrors and bumpers. In the UK it was a high trim level available with all engines (from 2.0 to 2.3 turbo). In Australia, the 940 SE was a high trim level with only the 2.3 Turbo B230FT with some extras as standard and featured, rather unusually, full painted bumpers. In Thailand the 940 SE was a Turbo (LPT) model with leather seats, ABS brakes and SRS Airbag. In the US, the 940 SE utilised the body from the 960 (different dashboard, firewall, hood, recessed windscreen wipers etc) with the four-cylinder B230FT engine, the 940 SE badge presumably chosen by Volvo in order to maintain the link between name and number of cylinders.

From MY 1993 on, in Italy all 940 estates were badged "Polar" (engine B200F) or "Super Polar" (engine B200FT). Towards the end of the model cycle, certain countries (as Sweden, Germany and Switzerland) had a well equipped special series badged "Classic". Production of the 940 series extended from 1990 to 5 February 1998.

North America
In the United States, the 1991 940 was offered in three versions: the 940 GLE used a DOHC 16-valve version of the 2.3-litre engine (B234) with a 6000 rpm redline. The 940 Turbo used a turbocharged 2.3-litre engine (B230FT), and the top-end 940 SE (also turbocharged) included body-coloured trim, and the premium features (leather, power seats/moonroof, etc.) as standard equipment.

This is one of the Volvo vehicles that was produced at Volvo's former manufacturing facility in Halifax, Nova Scotia. In 1993, 940s built at that plant were affixed with roundels at the rear window, to celebrate the plant's 30th anniversary.

For the 1992 model year the 940 GLE was downgraded with a 114 bhp version of the 2.3-litre four-cylinder engine and sold as the 940 GL. The 940 SE was in actuality a 960 Turbo sold as the 940 SE, while the 940 Turbo remained largely unchanged. US-sales ended in 1995 in favour of the Volvo 850 and Volvo 960 series.

Volvo 960

1990–1994 
Autumn of 1990 marked the launch of the Volvo 960 in time for the 1991 model year. This was the replacement for the 760. The 1991 960 was an evolutionary progression of the 1990 760, but it was also one of the first cars to feature the work of British designer Peter Horbury.

The most significant change was that, in most markets, the 960 was offered with an all-new aluminium 24-valve DOHC inline six-cylinder engine, often referred to as "white block" in the Volvo community due to its bare aluminium block. Some markets, such as Australia and Japan, saw 1991 960s equipped with the same B280E/F V6 engine ( at 5,100 rpm) that had powered the 1990 760. The 1992 model year saw the U.S. introduction of the DOHC inline six-cylinder engine. For the Italian and Portuguese markets, the 960 was available with the 16v 2-litre turbo (190/200 PS, 140/147 kW) from September 1990 until September 1993 along with the inline sixes.

The 960 received incremental changes for the 1992, 1993, and 1994 model years. Most visible were the new more shapely seats, and redesigned seat-belts with hydraulic pretensioners for 1992. 1993 saw a new more ergonomic shifter, and in 1994 dual front airbags were introduced in some markets. The opaque sunroof was replaced by a sliding sunshade and glass window.

Nilsson, a small coachbuilder in Laholm, Sweden, worked under contract with Volvo to supply the stretched 960 Executive (and the later Royal model, with Hermès leather interior). Nilsson offered a number of different lengths and sealed the window in the C-pillar for more privacy in the rear. The Executive had longer rear doors, longer versions had inserts behind the B-pillar.

For North America, the 1992–1994 Volvo 960s were built in Kalmar, Sweden. The very first Volvo 960 for the US-market rolled off the assembly line on August 12, 1991 as a 1992 model. The 1995 to 1998 960s were built in Göteborg, Sweden. The first 1995 model year (facelift) 960 was built on June 27, 1994.

1994–1998 
In 1994 (for the 1995 model year) the 960 received a facelift, including changes to the grille and body-coloured panels. The new 960 was the first car offered with standard daytime running lights in North America.

Only the modular six-cylinder engines were available from model year 1995 on. The front suspension was redesigned to more closely match that of the 850. The rear suspension received a completely redesigned multi-link independent system with a single fibreglass transverse leaf spring. The 1995 estate received independent rear suspension. Volvo reported that the single composite leaf spring used in the rear suspension of the 960 estate had the same mass as just one of the two springs it replaced. Boge's Nivomat self-leveling rear suspension system became an option rather than standard equipment.

Trim levels were GLT and SE for European markets.

From 1996, Volvo renamed the 960 in select markets as Volvo S90 (saloon) and Volvo V90 (estate) in alignment with the letter-and-number naming scheme used on their other models. This renaming applied to several European countries in late 1996, in North America from late 1996 for the 1997 model year, and in Australia from March 1997. The new name coincided with an improved air conditioning system.

All US cars were equipped with an electronically controlled Aisin AW-series automatic transmission. Beginning in the 1995 model year, European cars with the 2.5 L engines were also available with a manual transmission, the so-called M90, a strong new design that was derived from the Volvo 850's transmission. With the demise of the 2.5 L engine, the M90 was paired with a detuned version of the 3.0 L engine.

Production of the 960 and its S90 and V90 derivatives ended on 5 February 1998.

The S90/V90 nameplate returned to use when Volvo introduced its flagship model in 2016.

Specifications

Engines 
These engines were offered in the 900 Series vehicles over the years:

 B200E: 2.0 L inline-4, naturally aspirated, Bosch K-Jetronic 
 B200F: 2.0 L inline-4, naturally aspirated, Bosch LH-Jetronic 
 B200K: 2.0 L inline-4, naturally aspirated, Renix ignition, 200K had standard head unlike 230K
 B200ET: 2.0 L inline-4, turbocharged, Bosch Motronic engine management (155 PS)
 B200FT: 2.0 L inline-4, turbocharged, Bosch LH-Jetronic 
 B204E: 2.0 L 16-valve, DOHC, inline-4, naturally aspirated
 B204F: 2.0 L 16-valve, DOHC, inline-4, naturally aspirated and catalyzed
 B204FT: 2.0 L 16-valve, DOHC, inline-4, turbocharged
 B204GT: 2.0 L 16-valve, DOHC, inline-4, turbocharged
 B230E: 2.3 L inline-4, naturally aspirated, Bosch K-Jetronic fuel injection
 B230F: 2.3 L inline-4, naturally aspirated, 114 hp
 B230K: 2.3 L inline-4, naturally aspirated, Renix ignition, Heron head (introduced for the '85 model year)
 B230ET: 2.3 L inline-4, turbocharged, Bosch Motronic (introduced in the '85 model year)
 B230FK: 2.3 L inline-4, turbocharged, Low Pressure Turbo ('95— ), 135 hp
 B230FT: 2.3 L inline-4, turbocharged, 165 hp
 B234F: 2.3 L 16-valve, DOHC, inline-4, naturally aspirated, 155 hp
 B230FB: 2.3 L inline-4, naturally aspirated
 B280E: 2.8 L V6, naturally aspirated, Bosch LH-Jetronic 2.2,  Nordic or  European version even fire crankshaft
 B280F: 2.8 L V6, naturally aspirated, Bosch LH-Jetronic , even fire crankshaft
 D24: 2.4 L inline-6 diesel, naturally aspirated (Volkswagen)
 D24T: 2.4 L inline-6, turbo diesel, variant of the LT35 engine manufactured by Volkswagen
 D24TIC: 2.4 L inline-6, turbodiesel, intercooled, variant of the LT35 engine manufactured by Volkswagen
 B6244/B6254: 2.4/2.5 L 24-valve inline-6, naturally aspirated
 B6304: 2.9 L 24-valve inline-6, naturally aspirated

Transmissions 
Volvo offered various transmissions depending on the year/model/engine combinations including the:
 M46 manual transmission (4-speed + Laycock de Normanville overdrive)
 M47 manual transmission (5-speed)
 M90 manual transmission (5-speed)
 AW30-40 electronically controlled automatic transmission (4-speed, lockup torque converter)
 AW70/AW70L automatic transmission (3-speed + overdrive, lockup torque converter on some models)
 AW71 automatic transmission (3-speed + overdrive)
 AW72L automatic transmission (4-speed, lockup torque converter)
 ZF 4HP22 automatic transmission (4-speed, lockup torque converter)

References

External links

 Volvo Cars Heritage

900
Sedans
Station wagons
Executive cars
Luxury vehicles
Flagship vehicles
Rear-wheel-drive vehicles
Cars introduced in 1990
Cars discontinued in 1998